Balliett is a surname. Notable people with the surname include:

Amy Balliett (born 1982), American businesswoman
Blue Balliett (born 1955), American writer
Whitney Balliett (1926–2007), American jazz critic and book reviewer

See also
D. M. Balliet (1866–1960), American football player and coach